Zabryna Guevara (born January 12, 1972) is an American actress. She is known for playing the role of Melania Ortiz in 3 lbs and Sarah Essen in Gotham.  Guevara is also a theatrical actress and in 2013 held the role of Yazmin in the award-winning Quiara Alegría Hudes play Water by the Spoonful at Second Stage Theater. She is of mixed Hispanic and Black descent.

Career
Zabryna Guevara was born January 12, 1972. Her first role was in Law & Order as Lucita in 1997. Also in 1997, she starred in the film, The Hotel Manor Inn as Denise. Guevara would then guest star in 2 episodes of Law & Order: Special Victims Unit in 2002 and 2005 as Annie Colon and Julia Ortiz respectively. She would guest star in Law & Order again as Salma in 2003. In 2006, Guevara starred in the series 3 lbs as Melania Ortiz. In 2013 held the role of Yazmin in the award-winning Quiara Alegría Hudes play Water by the Spoonful at Second Stage Theater. In 2014, she landed the role of Trask's Secretary in the film X-Men: Days of Future Past. Also in 2014, Guevara landed the role of Sarah Essen in Gotham.

Filmography

Film

Television

Theatre

References

External links
 
 
 
 
 Zabryna Guevara on BuddyTV

Living people
20th-century American actresses
21st-century American actresses
American film actresses
Place of birth missing (living people)
American television actresses
1972 births
American people of Colombian descent
African-American actresses
20th-century African-American women
20th-century African-American people
21st-century African-American women
21st-century African-American people